Lynn Clark Hettrick (born March 13, 1944) was an American politician who was a Republican member of the Nevada General Assembly. During his tenure, he was the Assembly Minority Leader for the 1997, 1999, 2001, 2003, 2003 Special Sessions (two), 2004 Special Session, 2005, and 2005 Special Sessions. He was an investment manager by profession.

References

1944 births
Living people
People from Carmel-by-the-Sea, California
Republican Party members of the Nevada Assembly